Kapil Dev Agarwal is an Indian politician. He is a third-time M.L.A. from Muzaffarnagar, Uttar Pradesh. He belongs to Bhartiya Janta Party and he was also a former Chairman of Muzaffarnagar Nagar Palika. He was appointed a Minister of State (independent charge) in the Yogi Adityanath led UP Government. He holds the portfolio of Skill Development and Vocational Education.

Political career
Kapil Dev Aggarwal is a member of the 18th Legislative Assembly  and has earlier been part of the 16th and 17th Legislative Assembly of Uttar Pradesh. Since 2016, he has represented the Muzaffarnagar constituency and is a member of the Bharatiya Janata Party. He defeated Gaurav Swaroop in the bypolls held in 2016 by a margin of 7,352 votes. He retained his seat when he again defeated Gaurav Swaroop in the assembly elections of 2017 by a margin of 10,704 votes and was sworn in as the Minister of Skill Development and Vocational Education in the first cabinet expansion of Yogi Adityanath led UP Government.

In 2022 Uttar Pradesh Assembly Elections he defeated Saurabh Swaroop of SP-RLD alliance by a margin of 18,694 votes. He was reappointed the Minister of Skill Development and Vocational Education in Yogi Aadityanath Second Ministry.

Posts held

References

Bharatiya Janata Party politicians from Uttar Pradesh
Living people
Uttar Pradesh MLAs 2012–2017
Uttar Pradesh MLAs 2017–2022
1966 births